Buddleja sphaerocalyx is a species of flowering plant endemic to Madagascar. It grows in moist forests, principally along river banks, at altitudes of 300 – 2,200 m. The species was named and described in 1887 by Baker.

Description
Buddleja sphaerocalyx is a sarmentose shrub 2 – 3 m in height, the branchlets obscurely quadrangular, bearing opposite, connate-perfoliate leaves, 10 – 21 cm long by 3.0 – 11 cm wide, narrowly ovate, acuminate at the apex, and narrowing abruptly at the base; the margins irregularly crenate - dentate. The white inflorescences comprise solitary axillary flowers 4 – 10 cm long by 1.5 – 6 cm wide; the corollas 8.5 – 20 mm long.

Buddleja sphaerocalyx is closely allied to B. axillaris and B. cuspidata.

Cultivation
Buddleja sphaerocalyx is not known to be in cultivation.

References

sphaerocalyx
Plants described in 1887
Endemic flora of Madagascar
Flora of the Madagascar ericoid thickets
Flora of the Madagascar lowland forests
Flora of the Madagascar subhumid forests